Eskom Uganda or Eskom Uganda Limited (EUL) is the largest generator of energy in Uganda and was incorporated in 2002 for a 20 year concession under a government regulatory framework.

Location
The geographical coordinates of Eskom Uganda Headquarters are: 0°26'36.0"N, 33°11'02.0"E (Latitude:0.443333; Longitude:33.183889).

History
Following the dissolution of the erstwhile Uganda Electricity Board (UEB) in 2001, the electricity industry in the country was subdivided into four components as shown in the table below.

EUL was formed in November 2002, following a successful bid to operate Nalubaale Power Station, the only existing power plant owned by the government at that time. Later, when the Kiira Hydroelectric Power Station came online in 2003, the Uganda Electricity Generation Company Limited contracted it to EUL as well.

Operations
EUL is responsible for operating, maintaining and repairing two government-owned hydroelectric power stations. The older station, Nalubaale, which opened in 1954, has 10 generators with a capacity of 18 megawatts each. The newer station, Kiira, has five generators with a capacity of 40 megawatts each. The power generated is sold to the Uganda Electricity Transmission Company Limited (UETCL), the sole authorized bulk purchaser. UETCL in turn sells it to Umeme, the distributor, who in turn, sells it to end users.

Ownership
Eskom Uganda Limited is a wholly owned subsidiary of Eskom, the South African energy conglomerate . Although fully owned by the South African parent company, EUL is allowed to exercise a wide degree of autonomy. Its chief executive officer reports directly to the board of Eskom Holdings Limited.

See also
 List of power stations in Uganda
 West Nile Rural Electrification Company

References

External links
 Website of Eskom Uganda Limited

Energy companies of Uganda
Companies established in 2002
Buikwe District
2002 establishments in Uganda
Central Region, Uganda
Electric power companies of Uganda